Puževci (in older sources also Pužovci) is a small village in the Municipality of Puconci in the Prekmurje region of Slovenia.

There is a small neogothic chapel by the village cemetery. It was built in 1890 and has a three-story belfry.

References

External links
 Puževci on Geopedia

Populated places in the Municipality of Puconci